The 1971 Tour de France started with the following 13 teams, each with 10 cyclists:

Eddy Merckx, who had won the 1969 and 1970 Tours, was the big favourite. Pre-race predictions were certain that if he would not become ill or crash, Merckx would be the winner, and were speculating whether he would be able to lead the race from start to end.

With fewer flat stages, fewer time trials and more mountain stages, it was thought that climbers would have an advantage.

Teams

  (riders)
  (riders)
  (riders)
  (riders)
  (riders)
  (riders)
  (riders)
  (riders)
  (riders)
  (riders)
  (riders)
  (riders)
  (riders)

Cyclists

By starting number

By team

By nationality

Notes

References

1971 Tour de France
1971